Dava is an American musician, pop singer, and songwriter who made her debut on Disruptor Records with a single "ASOS".

Early life
Dava grew up in Oklahoma and Texas. Her mother died when she was eight. Then, she was raised by her grandmother for the most of her life. After high school, at 18, she moved to Colorado and then finally, settled in Los Angeles.

Career
Dave started her career as a bar and coffee shop singer at Oklahoma and Colorado. In 2020, she released her debut music video,  "ASOS", which was also her first track with Disruptor Records. In February 2021, she released a new track, "New Ceilings", co-written by Mike Adubato, following the release of singles like as "Right Time" and "Papercut". Her second release in 2021 was a track, "Sticky", co-written by Kyle Buckley, Kyle Scherrer, and Max Levin.

Musical style
As a musician, her compositions combine elements of Neo-soul, alternative, indie, and traditional R&B.

Albums and extended plays

References

Living people
Musicians from Oklahoma
21st-century American singers
21st-century American women singers
American women pop singers
American women songwriters
Year of birth missing (living people)